Eva Maria LaRue (born December 27, 1966) is an American actress and model. She is known for her roles as Maria Santos on All My Children and Det. Natalia Boa Vista on CSI: Miami.

Early life
LaRue was born in Long Beach, California to Marcie and Luis LaRue. She has three siblings, sisters Nika and Lara and a brother, Luis Jr. She is a member of the Baháʼí Faith.

LaRue began acting at the age of six and was later a teenage beauty queen. She won Danfranc Productions Miss California Empire 1984 title at the state pageant held in Irvine, California. In 1985, she graduated from Norco High School.

Career

Modeling 
LaRue started modeling after graduating from high school, first working with the Judith Fontaine Agency and eventually with Frederick's of Hollywood. She appeared in infomercials for Zumba fitness workout and Sheer Cover Studio mineral makeup. She has graced the cover of numerous magazines, including LA Direct, Vivmag, Orange Coast, InStyle Weddings, Woman's World and Latina.

Acting 
LaRue was the co-host and announcer on Candid Camera from 1991 to 1992. From 1993 to 1997, and again from 2002 to  2005, LaRue portrayed Dr. Maria Santos Grey on All My Children. There, she was half of All My Children supercouple Edmund and Maria. She received a Daytime Emmy Award nomination in the category of "Outstanding Supporting Actress in a Drama Series" for All My Children. She also received a nomination in 2004 in the category of "Outstanding Original Song" for composing the song "Dance Again with You", which was used as a backdrop to the lovemaking scene after the third marriage of the characters Edmund and Maria in June 2003.

In 2010, LaRue reprised her role as Maria temporarily on January 5 for All My Children'''s 40th anniversary.

LaRue also performed in television movies over the years, appearing as Annette Funicello in a biographical movie of the former Mouseketeer and also in the adaptation of Danielle Steel's Remembrance as Princess Serena.

In 2005 LaRue portrayed Linda Lorenzo, George Lopez's "Long Lost" sister, on the TV sitcom George Lopez. In the fall 2005, LaRue began the role of Natalia Boa Vista on CSI: Miami. It was revealed in the end of season four that Eva's character, Natalia Boa Vista, was the mole in the lab reporting back to the FBI. Beginning with season five, LaRue became a full-time cast member.

In July and September 2011,  LaRue reprised her role as Dr. Maria Santos Grey on All My Children as a guest star as the show wrapped up its network run on ABC. In 2013 she played Agent Tanya Mays in the episode "Final Shot" on Criminal Minds.

In July 2015, it was announced that LaRue had been cast on Fuller House, the revival series of the sitcom Full House. She portrayed the character of Teri Tanner, the vivacious and busty wife of Danny Tanner. The series premiered on Netflix in 2016. She also played the role of the Admirable in three episodes of Mack & Moxy. In May 2019, she was cast on The Young and the Restless in the role of Celeste Rosales.

Personal life
LaRue's sister Nika was one of the women photographed by convicted killer Bill Bradford for his collection. She was No. 3 (out of 54 photos) on the poster released by the Los Angeles Sheriff's Department to find living victims. Bradford would photograph women he met in bars and photo shoots under the guise that he would assist their modeling careers. The incident was used in CSI: Miami in the season five episode "Darkroom" soon after the revelation. Nika guest-starred in the episode as a reporter. She was initially offered the role of Eva's on-screen sister and a surviving victim, but declined that role, describing it as being "too surreal".

LaRue was married to actor John O'Hurley for two years until 1994. She married fellow All My Children co-star John Callahan in November 1996. The couple served as co-hosts of the 1997 Miss America pageant in Atlantic City, New Jersey. The couple's daughter Kaya McKenna Callahan was born in December 2001. The couple divorced in 2005.

LaRue married Joe Cappucio in June 2010 but Cappucio filed for divorce in 2014.

LaRue and her daughter were stalked by James David Rogers from 2012 to 2022, when Rogers was sentenced to 5 years in prison for his actions.

Filmography
Film

Television

 Awards 

References

External links

 
 
 2007 Eva LaRue Interview on Sidewalks Entertainment''

1966 births
20th-century Bahá'ís
21st-century Bahá'ís
Actresses from Long Beach, California
American Bahá'ís
American film actresses
American soap opera actresses
Living people
20th-century American actresses
21st-century American actresses
American female models
American people of Puerto Rican descent
Daytime Emmy Award winners
Daytime Emmy Award for Outstanding Guest Performer in a Drama Series winners